Gazanchi Fortress is fortress dated from the third millennium BC located in the village of Gazanchi. It is believed to have been heavily occupied by local tribes and is depicted in painted ceramic artifacts as having been a significant social center during the Middle Bronze Age.

See also 
 Architecture of Azerbaijan

References 

Palaces in Azerbaijan
Architecture in Azerbaijan
Tourist attractions in Azerbaijan